Zakeeya Patel (born 6 January 1988), is a South African actress and presenter. She is best known for her roles in the series Isidingo, 7de Laan and High Rollers.

Early life
Patel was born in Durban, South Africa. She is of Indian descent on her father's side and Coloured descent on her mother's. She graduated with a BA Honors Degree in Theatre and Performance from The University of Cape Town.

Career
In 2005, she played the role 'Samantha Sharma' in the television soap opera Isidingo. The show later became highly popular. Meanwhile in 2006, she became the champion of the Season 6 of the South African competition Dancing with the Stars. In 2012, she appeared in the comedy film Material and played the role 'Aisha Kaif'. Then in 2013, she appeared in show High Rollers. In 2014, she appeared with the stage play Emotional Creature in which he got the opportunity to work with acclaimed American activist and writer Eve Ensler.

In 2018, she acted in the film The Docket In 2019, she appeared in the Netflix original series Shadow. In the same year, she acted in the Showmax's thriller film The Girl from St. Agnes. In late 2019, she played a supportive role in the film 3 Days to Go. In 2020, she starred in the sequel to 2012 film Material titled as New Material.

Personal life
Patel married economist Rob Price in a multicultural interfaith ceremony in November 2017. They moved to Los Angeles, California in December 2019.

Filmography

Film

Television

References

External links
 
 Top Billing catches up with Zakeeya Patel her fiancee Rob Price

Living people
1988 births
21st-century South African actresses
Coloured South African people
South African film actresses
South African people of Indian descent
South African television actresses
People from Durban